Cholesterol is a signaling molecule that is highly regulated in eukaryotic cell membranes. In human health, its effects are most notable in inflammation, metabolic syndrome, and neurodegeneration. At the molecular level, cholesterol primarily signals by regulating clustering of saturated lipids and proteins that depend on clustering for their regulation.

Mechanism
Lipid rafts are loosely defined as clusters of cholesterol and saturated lipids forming regions of lipid heterogeneity in cellular membranes (e.g., the ganglioside GM1). The association of proteins to lipid rafts is cholesterol dependent and regulates the proteins function (e.g., substrate presentation).

Lipid raft regulation
Cholesterol regulates the function of several membrane proteins associated with lipid rafts. It does so by controlling the formation or depletion of lipid rafts in the plasma membrane. The lipid rafts house the membrane proteins and forming or depleting the lipid rafts moves the proteins in or out of the raft environment thereby exposing them to a new environment that can activate or deactivate the proteins. For example, cholesterol directly regulates the affinity of palmitoylated proteins for GM1 containing lipid rafts. Cholesterol signaling through lipid rafts can be attenuated by phosphatidylinositol 4,5 bisphophate signaling (PIP2). PIP2 contains mostly polyunsaturated lipids that partition away from saturated lipids. Proteins that bind both lipid rafts and PIP2 are negatively regulated by high levels of PIP2.  This effect was observed with phospholipase D.

In the brain, astrocytes make the cholesterol and transport it to nerves to control their function.

Substrate presentation
A protein that is regulated by raft associated protein translocation can be activated by substrate presentation. For example, if an enzyme translocate in the membrane to its substrate it can be activated by localization to its substrate independent of a conformational change in the enzyme.

Protein ligand
When cholesterol directly binds to a protein and alters its function it can be thought of as a protein ligand.

Ion channels
Cholesterol is thought to bind to cys loop receptors and allosterically modulate their gating.

Role in Disease

Alzheimer's Disease
In the brain, cholesterol is synthesized in astrocytes and transported to neurons with the cholesterol transport protein apolipoprotein E (apoE). The cholesterol controls the clustering of amyloid precursor protein with gamma secretase in GM1 lipid domains. High cholesterol induces APP hydrolysis and the eventual accumulation of amyloid plaques tau phosphorylation. The ApoE isotype4 is the greatest risk factor for sporadic Alzheimer's and this allele was shown to increase cholesterol in mice.

Inflammation
During an inflammatory response cholesterol is loaded into immune cells including macrophages. The cholesterol is a signal that activates cytokine production and other inflammatory responses. Cholesterol's role in inflammation is central to many diseases.

Viral entry
Cholesterol loading into cells was recently shown to increase SARS-CoV-2 infectivity.

Coronary Heart Disease
inflammation induced by cholesterol loading into immune cells causes heart disease. A class of drugs called statins blocks cholesterol synthesis and is used extensively in treating heart disease.

Steroids
Cholesterol is precursor for steroid hormones including progestogens, glucocorticoids, mineralocorticoids, androgens, and estrogens.

History
Brown and Goldstein discovered the LDL receptor and showed cholesterol is loaded into cells through receptor mediated endocytosis. Until recently cholesterol was thought of primarily as a structural component of the membrane. However, more recently, cholesterol uptake was shown to signal an immune response in macrophages. More importantly, the ability to efflux cholesterol through ABC transporters was shown to attenuate (i.e., shut down) the inflammatory response.

References

Biochemistry